Epitaph is the eleventh full-length studio album by Vancouver industrial band Front Line Assembly, released in 2001.

Release
With the release, Metropolis also issued a Digipak version that contains a hidden bonus track and was limited to 25.000 copies. Even though the bonus track was originally announced as untitled, its title was later revealed as "Submerged".

The track "Existence" is featured in the 2002 horror film Resident Evil but not on the accompanying soundtrack.

In 2015, Canadian label Artoffact re-released Epitaph on limited edition vinyl.

Single
"Everything Must Perish" is the only single taken from Epitaph. Along with the original version the title track is featured as radio edit. Non-album track "Providence" is sung by Jenifer McLaren, also guest vocalist on Delerium's Poem. Johan Carlsson from Release Magazine wrote that the band has taken "a more mature and melodic route" with the single. Noting the Delerium influence on "Providence", he described the song as "beefed up, speeded up and dancified Delerium track".

Writing and composition
Being a characteristic feature on previous recordings, on Epitaph Front Line Assembly did not use samples. "This is the first time we quit using movie samples.", said Bill Leeb to Belgian magazine Side-Line and cited the more important role of samples in contemporary music and its financial side: "Sampling is an artform which was criticised in the beginning, but now it's a respected artform with big money in it. It's a big business where I don't feel at ease any longer."

Track listing

Personnel

Front Line Assembly
 Bill Leeb – production, vocals
 Chris Peterson – production

Technical personnel
 Greg Reely – mixing, engineering
 Brian Gardner – mastering
 Dave McKean – artwork, design

References

2001 albums
Front Line Assembly albums
Metropolis Records albums
Albums with cover art by Dave McKean
Albums produced by Chris Peterson (producer)